Shivani Raghuvanshi is an Indian actress. She made her acting debut in the 2014 dark comedy Titli, she earned wider recognition for her role in the webseries Made in Heaven.

Filmography
Shockers (TV Series)
Jaan The Jigar (Short Movie)
Jutti, The Shoe (Short Movie) (2018)
Angrezi Mein Kehte Hain
Titli (2014)
Dancing Dad
Posham Pa (2019)
Devi (Short movie)
 Baatein (short film)
 Comedy Circus (2018)
 Made in Heaven (2019) as Jaspreet "Jazz" Kaur
 Raat Akeli Hai (2020)

Awards 

 Most Promising Newcomer Female (22nd Screen Awards)

References

External links
 
 

21st-century Indian actresses
1991 births
Living people
Actresses in Hindi television
Screen Awards winners
Place of birth missing (living people)